Eleonora d'Este (4 July 1515 – 1575) was a Ferrarese noblewoman. She was the first daughter of Alfonso I d'Este, Duke of Ferrara and his second wife Lucrezia Borgia – as his first daughter, Alfonso named her after his mother Eleanor of Naples.

Life
She was brought up in Ferrara and her mother died when she was four – her father had two more children with Laura Dianti. Eleonora was the only one of Alfonso and Lucrezia's daughters to survive both their parents. She became a nun at the Corpus Domini Monastery and was buried there alongside her mother and other members of her family.

Musica quinque vocum motetta materna lingua vocata 
In 1543, Girolamo Scotto of Venice published a collection of 43 religious motets under the title Musica quinque vocum motetta materna lingua vocata. There is no indication in that publication as to who the composer might have been.

Laurie Stras, professor of music at Southampton University, has argued that Leonora may have been the composer. Leonora was triply disqualified from being named in those days: being a woman, and a princess, and a nun.

References

Sources
http://viaf.org/viaf/95313383
Sarah Bradford: Lucrezia Borgia. Mondadori Editore, Milan (2005),

External links
 – which wrongly assigns the vocal parts as "cantus, altus, tenor, bassus" only, even though it correctly says that the motets are for five unaccompanied voices; "quinque" in the title is unambiguous

1515 births
1575 deaths
16th-century Italian Roman Catholic religious sisters and nuns
Eleonora
People from Ferrara
Daughters of monarchs